Signal Hill Elementary School is the name for the following schools:

Signal Hill Elementary School (Signal Hill, California) - Signal Hill, California
Signal Hill Elementary School (Belleville, Illinois) - Belleville, Illinois
Signal Hill Elementary School (Dix Hills, New York) - Dix Hills, New York
Signal Hill Elementary School (Prince William County, Virginia) - Prince William County, Virginia
Signal Hill Elementary School (Pemberton, British Columbia) - Pemberton, British Columbia

Schools with similar names

Signal Hill School (Voorhees, New Jersey) - Voorhees, New Jersey
Signal Mountain Middle School - Signal Mountain, Tennessee
Signal Hill Secondary Comprehensive School - Signal Hill Scarborough, Tobago, Trinidad and Tobago

See also

Signal Hill (disambiguation)